Abdul Bari Omar is an Afghan physician who is currently serving as Acting Director, Food and Drug Administration. Omar has also served the acting Deputy Minister of Public Health of Afghanistan from 21 September 2021 to early 2022, alongside Mohammad Hassan Ghiasi.

He was born in 1987 in Daudkhil Village of Pol-e Alam, Logar Province, Afghanistan. He completed his primary and secondary education in his hometown before traveling abroad for medical education. He graduated from the Faculty of Therapeutics of Pajhwok University. He also received a postgraduate diploma in imaging and ultrasonography.

References

Living people
1987 births
Taliban government ministers of Afghanistan
People from Logar Province
Afghan physicians